The Sokh is a river in Kyrgyzstan and Uzbekistan. It takes its rise at the joint of the north slopes of Alay Mountains and Turkestan Range and ends in Ferghana Valley. The Sokh is a left tributary of the Syr Darya. Currently it is largely used for irrigation. Sokh is full-flowing in June-August, and it falls in September. Its largest tributary is the Kojashkan.

References

Rivers of Uzbekistan
Rivers of Kyrgyzstan
International rivers of Asia